Treffinger is a surname. Notable people with the surname include:

Carolyn Treffinger (1891–1991), American writer
James W. Treffinger (born 1950), American lawyer and politician